Wolfgang Baumgart (23 October 1949 in Inheiden – 21 February 2011) was a German field hockey player who competed in the 1968 Summer Olympics and in the 1972 Summer Olympics.

References

External links
 

1949 births
2011 deaths
German male field hockey players
Olympic field hockey players of West Germany
Field hockey players at the 1968 Summer Olympics
Field hockey players at the 1972 Summer Olympics
Olympic gold medalists for West Germany
Olympic medalists in field hockey
Medalists at the 1972 Summer Olympics
20th-century German people